Maurice Racca (born 9 November 1922) is a French former sport shooter who competed in the 1956 Summer Olympics.

References

1922 births
Living people
French male sport shooters
Olympic shooters of France
Shooters at the 1956 Summer Olympics